In various cultures, a middle name is a portion of a personal name that is written between the person's first given name and their surname.
A middle name is often abbreviated and is then called middle initial or just initial.

A person may be given a middle name regardless of whether it is necessary to distinguish them from other people with the same given name and surname. In cultures where a given name is expected to precede the surname, additional names are likely to be placed after the given name and before the surname, and thus called middle names. 

The use of multiple middle names has been somewhat impeded recently by the increased use of computer databases that occasionally allow for only a single middle name or more commonly a middle initial in storing personal records, effectively preventing people with multiple middle names from being listed in such databases under their full name. This is worsened by longer compound names, like María del Pilar Pereyra or María de las Nieves García Fernández. A workaround would be to add the middle name alongside the first given name or surname, however this is not always possible.

Usage in various languages

English
Among royalty and aristocracy, middle names have been used since the late 17th century (and possibly earlier), as exemplified in the name of the Stuart pretender James Francis Edward Stuart (1688–1766).  Despite their relatively long existence in North America, the term middle name was not recorded until 1835, in the periodical Harvardiana.

Not every name that stands as the middle word in a three-name string is a middle name. Major classes of this theme are as follows:
 When part of a two-word given name: for example, Mary Anne and Jo Anne. 
 When part of a two-word surname, that is, a compound surname: for example, David Lloyd George or Henry Bence Jones, whose surnames are open compounds (that is, Bence is not his middle name; Bence Jones is his compound surname). 
 A maiden name expressed: for example, Hillary Clinton (nee Rodham) is sometimes known as Hillary Rodham Clinton. 
 A patronymic in any of various Slavic languages, including Russian and Bulgarian, such as Nikita Sergeyevich Khrushchev, is not normally considered a middle name. Russian language and culture has certain norms for when someone is to be called by their given name plus patronymic versus a title plus the surname (for example, Nikita Sergeyevich versus Mr. Khrushchev). The distinction is similar to the T–V distinction. See also eastern Slavic naming customs. 
 Traditional Québécois names: Traditionally, Roman Catholic Québécois, Franco-Ontarian, and Franco-Manitoban children were given three names, the first being Joseph or Marie, the second the godfather's or godmother's name, and the third the name chosen by the parents for the child. Examples include Jean Chrétien (Joseph Jacques Jean Chrétien) and Gabrielle Roy (Marie Rose Emma Gabrielle Roy). Some children (especially those with English mothers) were given extra names that could serve as middle names in the anglophone tradition; for example, Pierre Elliott Trudeau (Joseph Philippe Pierre Yves Elliott Trudeau). These traditions became less common after the Quiet Revolution.

In the U.S., the middle name is often abbreviated to the middle initial (e.g. Mary Lee Bianchi becomes Mary L. Bianchi). This is usually standard for signatures or omitted entirely in everyday use (e.g. just Mary Bianchi). An individual may have more than one middle name, or none. In the United Kingdom, for comparison, she would usually be referred to as either Mary Bianchi, M. L. Bianchi or Mary Lee Bianchi, or she may choose Lee Bianchi, and informally there may be familiar shortenings.

In countries that primarily speak English—such as Australia, Canada, Ireland, New Zealand, the United States, and the United Kingdom—the forename of a relative is sometimes used as one's middle name to honor familial heritage. Typical examples are a father named John William Smith whose son is named Thomas John Smith or a grandmother named Mary Grace Tilley whose granddaughter is named Ashley Mary Smith. In many cases in the United States, however, a person's middle name does not derive from relatives, but is used instead to honor close family friends or notable public figures. A rare case of an individual being given only an initial as a middle name, with the initial not explicitly standing for anything, was Harry S. Truman. (He once told reporters—apparently at odds with his own practice—that the S should thus not be followed by period.) Other people with single-letter middle names include Robert B. Hollander Jr. and Mark M Davis.

More than two given names are fairly common. In England, they are traditionally more common among the upper and middle classes.

There is a minor tradition in English-speaking countries whereby maiden names from the family tree that are especially celebrated by the family are carried into succeeding generations as middle names or as given names, whereas the tradition of married names would otherwise obliterate them. For example, this is how the first name of Johns Hopkins came to have the terminal -s that differentiates it from John; Johns was the surname of some of his ancestors. It is also how Robert Strange McNamara got his middle name (it was his mother's maiden name). There is some overlap between open-compound surnames and maiden-names-as-middle-names; in various cases the same motivation (preserving maiden names from oblivion) has produced both such kinds of names, and there are instances from the nineteenth century that are ambiguous today as to how the bearers of a name thus inspired parsed it themselves (either as part of a compound surname or as a middle name). 

The abbreviation "N.M.N." (no middle name) or "N.M.I." (no middle initial), with or without periods, is sometimes used in formal documents in the United States, where a middle initial or name is expected but the person does not have one. Rarely a person may assign themselves a middle initial to overcome the problems imposed by systems whose design failed to properly handle the absence of one or the ambiguity of human names' being non-unique. For example, David X. Cohen assigned himself a new middle initial to overcome a flaw in a system that failed to handle the ambiguity of human names properly (he was David S. Cohen but the system could not enter him because another David S. Cohen was already entered therein; using "X." circumvented the problem). 

A middle name that is rather unusual among English speakers is that of Jennifer 8. Lee, an American author. Lee was not given a middle name at birth so she chose "8" when she was a teenager, in a nod to her Chinese ancestry; in Chinese culture, the number eight symbolizes prosperity and good luck.

Middle name as primary forename
In England and the United States, some who choose to be known primarily by their middle name abbreviate their first name as an initial, e.g. J. Edgar Hoover (John Edgar Hoover), J. Paul Getty (John Paul Getty), and F. Scott Fitzgerald (Francis Scott Key Fitzgerald). 

Many others simply omit the first name in regular usage, treating their middle name like a first name, e.g. Woodrow Wilson (Thomas Woodrow Wilson). It is increasingly common within political fields, with many U.S. politicians using their middle name as a first name—for example, Mitch McConnell (Addison Mitchell McConnell), Mitt Romney (Willard Mitt Romney), Jon Ossoff (Thomas Jonathan Ossoff), Jon Tester (Raymond Jon Tester), Ted Cruz (Rafael Edward Cruz) and Mike Rounds (Marion Michael Rounds) are all sitting U.S. senators who use their middle names as first names.

In Britain, many politicians, including several prime ministers, have been known primarily by their middle name, or one of their middle names. The ten prime ministers to have done so are Bonar Law (Andrew Bonar Law), Ramsay MacDonald (James Ramsay MacDonald), Neville Chamberlain (Arthur Neville Chamberlain), Anthony Eden (Robert Anthony Eden), Harold Macmillan (Maurice Harold Macmillan), Harold Wilson (James Harold Wilson), Jim Callaghan (Leonard James Callaghan), Gordon Brown (James Gordon Brown), Boris Johnson (Alexander Boris de Pfeffel Johnson), and Liz Truss (Mary Elizabeth Truss).

In Germany, during the Nazi period, several Nazis were known by their middle names. Examples include Joseph Goebbels (Paul Joseph Goebbels), Adolf Eichmann (Otto Adolf Eichmann), Erwin Rommel (Johannes Erwin Eugen Rommel), Hermann Fegelein (Hans Otto Georg Hermann Fegelein), Magda Goebbels (Johanna Maria Magdalena Goebbels) and Joachim von Ribbentrop (Ulrich Friedrich Wilhelm Joachim Ribbentrop).

Chinese

Traditionally, Chinese names consisted of three characters—the surname, followed by a two-character given name (ming), which is not separated into a first and middle name in usage.  Two-character given names follow a naming tradition in which the first character of the given name (and thus the second character in the three-character full name) indicates the person's generation in his/her family.  For example, the Yongzheng Emperor of the Qing dynasty has the given name Yinzhen (胤禛) while his brothers' names all begin with the character "Yin" (胤).  His sons' and nephews' given names all begin with the character Hong (弘). Traditionally, the list of generational names may be decided many generations in advance by the ancestors.  In such naming systems, the de facto given name is the last character of a person's full name. Even if that was the case most of the time, sometimes the person's given name is the middle character and not the last. A three-character name is both patriarchal and hierarchical, as it would inform of a person's belonging and rank within a family. During the One-child Policy, there was no need for a generation name as there was only one child in each generation. Many names in Mainland China were shortened to two-characters during this time, and there are many adults with shorter names remnant from this era. This would not be found in Taiwan or Hong Kong.

A fading Chinese tradition is to use a courtesy name, called zì (字) in place of a male's given name in adulthood.  Traditionally zì is given by one's father upon reaching the age of maturity at 20 years old.  This name is intended for use in formal situations and formal writing and confers a status of adulthood and respect.  Like the ming, the zì is composed of two characters which usually reflect the meaning of the ming.  Prior to the 20th century, sinicized Koreans, Vietnamese, and Japanese were also referred to by their zì.  An alternative courtesy name is the hào (Japanese gō; Korean: ho; Vietnamese: hiệu), which usually referred to as the pseudonym. A hào was usually self-chosen and it was possible to have more than one. It had no connection with the bearer's míng or zì; rather it was often a personal choice and may have reflected a personal belief or philosophy. Chinese adults may more frequently use the hào to refer to themselves. The zì or hào can be used independently of the given name and of each other, but the given name is almost always used with the family name in official situations.

Some Chinese Americans move their Chinese given name (transliterated into the Latin alphabet) to the middle name position and use an English first name, e.g. James Chu-yu Soong, Jerry Chih-Yuan Yang, and Michelle Wingshan Kwan. The Chinese given name usually has two characters which are usually combined into a single middle name for better organizational purposes, especially with Cantonese names, such as Bruce Lee's middle name, Junfan. There are also some new immigrants whose Chinese given names are their first names followed by English middle names.

The practice of taking English and Chinese given names is also common in Malaysia, Singapore, Hong Kong, and Taiwan. However, rather than placing the Chinese given name between the English given name and the family name, it is commonly placed after the family name in these places. Under such a system, Bruce Junfan Lee would have been Bruce Lee Junfan. This practice is consistent with both the Western convention of putting the given name before the family name and the Chinese convention of putting the given name after the family name.

Indian languages
Traditional names in India vary regionally due to its ethnic and religious diversity. Modern Hindu names across India adopt a first name, which is usually a word in Sanskrit or an indigenous Indian language, a middle name, which is the name of a child's father or spouse in case of a married lady followed by the surname which is usually the caste that the person's family belongs to, usually taken from the father or husband. However, diversity exists even here, for instance middle and last names from the traditionally matrilineal Nair community in Kerala are based on the mother's family. For example, in the case of the well-known statesman, VK Krishna Menon, his first name would be Krishna, the V stands for Vengyalil, which is a well known aristocratic Nair family from Kerala that Krishna's mother belonged to, the K stands for Krishnan, his father's name and the surname is Menon, one of the Nair subcastes. In modern times, this name would perhaps be styled as Krishna Vengyalil Krishnan Menon, in that order, Vengyalil Krishnan being the middle name. Traditionally the Dalit population of India were excluded from India's caste system and do not have a middle name and a caste surname. The same is true for people who have given up their caste identity, whose name just includes the person's first name followed by their father's name. Sometimes, the place of birth of an individual is included as their middle name. 
Among the Sikhs of India, many have adopted the middle name Singh or Kaur which mean lion and princess respectively. This is followed by their Punjabi caste surname. Nowadays, many Sikhs have done away with their caste surname and have just kept Singh or Kaur as their surname. 
Among Indian Muslims, similar naming conventions to Hindus and Sikhs are followed, but the names are usually in Arabic, Persian or Urdu.

Usage in various regions

Scandinavia
The naming convention of the Scandinavian countries do not use given names as middle names. While extra first names often are referred to as middle names in everyday language, the laws in these countries do not reflect this, and considers all of them first names. A person can have multiple first names, but usually only one of these is used when addressing the person, possibly creating confusion in some circumstances. An issued passport will contain all names, but all except the surname will be listed as first/given names. Names combined with a hyphen are counted as one name. A person named "Ulrika Britt-Inger Marie Fredriksson" has three first names and one last name, and either of the three first names could be chosen to be her tilltalsnamn ("spoken-to-name"). It usually is the first name in the order that a person uses day-to-day, and is often the only first name used even in formal settings. Unlike the middle names in some English speaking countries that are used as initials, the additional first names are either spelled out in full or fully omitted. Together with a person's personal identification number in Sweden, Denmark, Norway, or Iceland, only signing with the tilltalsnamn and the last name is usually sufficient for almost all legal documents. A person can change their tilltalsnamn to one of the other already given names without applying for a name change. It is possible to apply to have the order swapped if desired, as the first of the first names will be assumed to be the tilltalsnamn.

In Denmark, Sweden, and Norway, the legal term middle name refers most often to names that are originally surnames, but not part of the last name of the name bearer. A middle name could be e.g. one's mother's maiden name or the last name of another recent ancestor (for instance a grandparent). The historical purpose of middle names is to honour a relative or another person, particularly a godparent, or even a completely unrelated person, such as a locally or nationally prominent figure. Until the 19th century, it was not unusual to have the last name of a godparent as one's middle name, even when the godparent was not a blood relative. This practice, and the use of middle names in general, however, was mostly limited to the bourgeois class and the nobility, and was seldom seen among common people. In the 20th century, the use of middle names, especially one's mother's maiden name, was more widely adopted, although it is by no means mandatory. There are few set rules for how names are constructed today; people are required to have one or more given names and one family name, but the legal middle name is restrictive.

In the example Carl Viggo Manthey Lange, the names Carl and Viggo are given names, while Manthey is a middle name and Lange is the family name. Manthey is his mother's maiden name. Unless his full name is used, he is correctly referred to as Mr. Lange, not as Mr. Manthey Lange. Carl Viggo Manthey Lange has a name typical of the Norwegian bourgeois class, with both his family name and his middle name being of foreign origin and being recognised surnames. Most Norwegians and Danes of the working class and peasant class used patronymics until the 19th century, when permanent family names became mandatory, first in Denmark in the early 19th century and then in Norway around 1900. A middle name is usually a recognised surname and not a patronymic. One reason middle names have become popular in the 20th century, particularly in Denmark, is that most Danish surnames originated as patronymics and are shared by a large number of people. The use of middle names in modern times serves to differentiate them from other people. For example, Danish politician Lars Løkke Rasmussen has some of the most common given and last names in Denmark (Lars and Rasmussen); his mother's maiden name is the slightly more unusual name Løkke, derived from a small agricultural property, so he uses it as a middle name, which differentiates him from other people named Lars Rasmussen.

In Sweden, the position is much the same as in Denmark. Middle names were inaugurated in the previous Name Act of 1963, then called "tilläggsnamn" (additional name), and are called "mellannamn" (middle name) as of the present Name Act of 1983. However, it had previously been more common to join e.g. the last names of both of a child's parents, or for a married woman to join her maiden name and the husband's last name, as a double name with a hyphen; and large portions of the Swedish population have not adapted to the official system to this day, i.e. for almost 50 years. People often use a hyphen between their middle name and last name themselves, and/or are spelled that way by other people and by mass media.

Occasionally, Scandinavians choose to use their middle name as their surname in everyday life. So Per Gottfrid Svartholm Warg has Per and Gottfrid as his given names, where Gottfrid, not Per, is his name of address, Svartholm as his middle name and Warg as his last name, but in practice he uses Svartholm as a surname. This usage, however, is unofficial. Historically, a middle name could become part of a double-barreled surname (family name) and hence cease to be a middle name, especially if used for several generations. There are many family names of this kind, which contributes to the confusion about middle names that shall not be hyphenated. Some of these double-barreled surnames are combined with a hyphen, while others are not, so a double surname without a hyphen can sometimes be indistinguishable from a middle name followed by a family name.

Vietnam

Traditional middle names in Vietnamese are "Văn" for male names and "Thị" for female names. However, modern Vietnamese do not consider these to be attractive names, especially "Thị". Therefore, nowadays popular middle names also are popular first names. Middle names play an important role in Vietnamese full names; they could help create beautiful names when combined with first names, distinguishing people who have the same first name (there are many common last names in Vietnam), and also distinguishing the gender of the names (unisex names are used widely in Vietnam). Hence, Vietnamese rarely abbreviate their middle names.

Philippines

Middle names constitute the mother's maiden surname; is inserted between the given name and the surname (father's surname) and almost always abbreviated signifying that it is a "middle name". 
For example; given the name Jose Patricio Santos. This is usually abbreviated to Jose P. Santos. The abbreviated "P" signifies it is the maternal maiden surname.
If a person has two given names, Jonathan Jose P. Santos, the abbreviated "P" will represent the mother's surname. The given name would therefore be Jonathan Jose. The second name "Jose" is never classified as a middle name. There have been a few documented exceptions, such as Benigno S. Aquino III, Jose P. Laurel, and Manuel L. Quezon, whose Western-style middle initials actually stand for their second given names Simeon, Paciano, and Luis respectively.

See also
Icelandic name
Roman naming conventions
Personal name

References

External links

 The Power and Peril of the Middle Name from BBC News
 All About Middle Names 

Human names